Robert Charles Peart (17 December 1926 – 22 December 1966) was an English professional footballer who played as a centre forward.

References

1926 births
1966 deaths
Sportspeople from Swindon
English footballers
Association football forwards
Burnley F.C. players
Swindon Town F.C. players
Oxford United F.C. players
Cheltenham Town F.C. players
English Football League players